Naphthol AS is an organic compound with the formula C10H6(OH)C(O)NHC6H5.  It is the anilide of 3-hydroxy-2-carboxynaphthalene.  Many analogous compounds are known, designated with a differing suffix.  For example, in Naphthol AS-OL, the aryl substituent on nitrogen is C6H4-2-OCH3.  These compounds are used as coupling partners in the preparation of some azo dyes.

History 
In 1911, it was found to be a good precursor to dyes for wool by chemists at K. Oehler Anilin- und Anilinfarbenfabrik Offenbach.

References

Organic pigments
Azo dyes
Amides